Pennadomo is a comune and town in the province of Chieti in the Abruzzo region of Italy.

In the 2001 national census the town had a population of 358 inhabitants, members of 173 families. The town had 12 companies and 2 administrative offices employing a total of 53 of the population. The population had fallen by 57 persons (14 percent) from the 1991 census.

References

External links

 Official website

Cities and towns in Abruzzo